Olof Ahlberg (18 November 1876 – 8 June 1956) was a Swedish sculptor. He is known for his human sculptures with classical and jugend features.

His work was part of the sculpture event in the art competition at the 1948 Summer Olympics.

References

1876 births
1956 deaths
20th-century Swedish sculptors
20th-century Swedish male artists
Swedish male sculptors
Olympic competitors in art competitions
People from Östersund Municipality